The A4136 road is the main road through the Forest of Dean in Gloucestershire, England and Monmouthshire, Wales. At its western end it connects to the A466 road at Wyesham, which is a short distance from Wye Bridge and the A40 road at Monmouth. Its eastern end at Huntley, Gloucestershire also connects to the A40.

Places served
West to East
Wyesham
The Kymin
Staunton
Berry Hill
Five Acres
Edge End
Worrall Hill
Brierley
Nailbridge
Plump Hill
Mitcheldean
Longhope
Little London
Huntley

References

External links

SABRE entry

Roads in England
Transport in Gloucestershire
Roads in Wales
Transport in Monmouthshire